El Rincón is a town in the municipality of Tepehuanes of the State of Durango of Mexico.

A small town that rests upon the crest of a mountainside. Home to roughly 400 people. The surrounding town, Tepehuanes, is the hub of transport, education, and supplies for El Rincon. Every so often, rodeos are held on top of a hill. It is by the town of Arroyo Chico. The Tepehuanes river runs to the north and west of the pueblo. It is a few hours drive from the city of Durango, Durango.

Some small stores are located within the small town. Supplies are brought in by trucks off the interstate a few miles away. One store is called "La Peke". No schools are in the town, so the residents go to a school in San Jose de la Boca.

Populated places in Durango